Singapore has sent athletes to most Summer Olympics held since 1948, when it was established as a separate British Crown Colony from the Straits Settlements just over three months before the commencement of the 1948 Summer Olympics. It continued to send a team to the Games until 1964 when Singapore was part of Malaysia, which sent a combined team. Upon Singapore's full independence from Malaysia in 1965, the country continued to participate in all subsequent editions of the Summer Olympics except in 1980 when the country participated in a large Olympic boycott. Singapore made their Winter Olympics debut at the 2018 Winter Olympics, with speed skater, Cheyenne Goh, competing in the short track speed skating event. Ethnic Chinese from Singapore had also competed for China at the Olympics as part of their football team, namely Chua Boon Lay in 1936, and Chia Boon Leong and Chu Chee Seng in 1948.

Under the Major Games Award Programme by the Singapore National Olympics Council, individual gold, silver and bronze medalists are awarded ,  and  respectively. Team Event and Team Sport medalists are awarded different amounts for each medal type.

Performance 
The country has won five Olympic medals, the first was at the 1960 Summer Olympics, the second at the 2008 Summer Olympics and the third and fourth at the 2012 Summer Olympics. At the 2016 Summer Olympics Singapore won their first ever gold medal and the fifth overall.

Singapore's first Olympic medal was won by Tan Howe Liang, who won silver in lightweight weightlifting in 1960 Summer Olympics. The first Olympic gold medal was won by Joseph Schooling in the men's 100 metre butterfly at the 2016 Summer Olympics.

In table tennis, Jing Junhong, Li Jiawei and Yu Mengyu came close to winning medals by finishing in fourth place for the women's singles events at the 2000 Sydney Olympics, 2004 Athens Olympics and 2020 Tokyo Olympics respectively.

During the 2008 Beijing Olympics, Singapore sent its largest contingent at that time, since it first participated, and was considered the best prepared to win a medal. Li Jiawei, together with Feng Tianwei and Wang Yuegu, beat the South Korea Women's Table Tennis team, composed of Dang Ye-Seo, Kim Kyung-Ah and Park Mi-Young 3–2 in the semi-finals, assuring Singapore of at least a silver medal and ending Singapore's 48-year Olympic medal drought. Singapore faced host China in the gold medal final and lost in straight sets but won the silver medal.

In the 2012 London Olympics, Feng beat Kasumi Ishikawa from Japan 4–0 in the table tennis women's singles bronze medal match, winning Singapore's first individual Olympic medal in 52 years since since Tan won the silver medal at the 1960 Rome Games. In the table tennis women's team bronze medal match, Li, together with Feng and Wang, beat the South Korea team composing Dang Ye-Seo, Kim Kyung-Ah and Seok Ha-Jung 3–0, winning another bronze medal.

The two bronze medals won at the 2012 London Summer Olympics marked the first time that Singapore won more than one medal in an Olympiad.

In the 2016 Rio Olympics, Olympic swimmer Joseph Schooling won a gold medal in the Men's 100 metre butterfly in an Olympics record of 50.39 seconds, becoming the first gold Olympic medallist of Singapore. This was also the first gold medal by a Southeast Asian male swimmer and the first Olympic gold that Singapore achieved.

During the 2020 Summer Olympics held in Tokyo, Japan, Singapore sent 23 athletes to the Games but failed to win any medals.

As of 2021, athletes from Singapore have won a total of 5 medals at the Olympics including 1 gold.

Medal tables

Medals by Summer Olympiad

Medals by Winter Olympic

Medals by sport

List of medalists

See also
 List of flag bearers for Singapore at the Olympics

References

External links